Mica is a commune in Mureș County, Transylvania, Romania. It is composed of seven villages: Abuș (Abosfalva; Abtsdorf), Căpâlna de Sus (Felsőkápolna), Ceuaș (Szászcsávás), Deaj (Désfalva), Hărănglab (Harangláb), Mica and Șomoștelnic (Somostelke).

History
It formed part of the Székely Land region of the historical Transylvania province. Until 1918, the village belonged to the Maros-Torda County of the Kingdom of Hungary. After the Treaty of Trianon of 1920, it became part of Romania.

Villages

Abuş
Abuş is situated 9 kilometers away from Târnăveni, on the county road DJ 142, and on the railway from Blaj-Târnăveni-Praid. It was first attested in a document in 1361 with the name Obusfaolua (Abosfalva). In 1910 it had 460 people, and according to the 1992 census it had 358 inhabitants.

See also
List of Hungarian exonyms (Mureș County)

References

Communes in Mureș County
Localities in Transylvania

hu:Mikefalva